Aleksandr Ivanovich Artemyev (1820–1874) was a Russian statistician, archeologist, ethnographer and geographer; State Councillor, senior editor of the Central Statistical Committee, member of the Statistical Council of the Ministry of Internal Affairs of the Russian Empire.

References

External links
 Биографическая справка

1820 births
People from Khvalynsk
1874 deaths
Ethnographers from the Russian Empire
Geographers from the Russian Empire
Librarians from the Russian Empire
Russian statisticians
Archaeologists from the Russian Empire
Deaths from cancer in Russia
Kazan Federal University alumni
Politicians of the Russian Empire
Interior ministers of Russia